Vailly British Cemetery is a war cemetery at Vailly-sur-Aisne, France, maintained by the Commonwealth War Graves Commission.

Most of the men interred at Vailly were killed in the Battle of the Aisne in September 1914.

Theodore Wright (1883–1914), recipient of the Victoria Cross, is buried here.

References

External links 
 
 

Commonwealth War Graves Commission cemeteries in France
World War I cemeteries in France